= Sino-Spanish Association for Energy and Sustainability =

Sino-Spanish Association for Energy and Sustainability (ASEES)
- Type: Nonprofit organization
- Industry: Renewable Energy, Sustainability, Environment
- Founded: (2009)
- Founder: Cosme de Arana (CEO)
- Headquarters: Spain Calle Modesto Lafuente, 41 – 1 °C, 28003 Madrid. Telephone +34918371203. China 503, R&F Center. 10, Huaxia Lu, Zhujiang Xin Cheng, Tianhe District, 510623 Guangzhou. Telephone +862038927437. Mobile +86136607469
- Area served: Asia Pacific
- Website: asees.org

The Sino-Spanish Association for Energy and Sustainability (ASEES) is a Spanish non-profit organization founded in 2009 by Cosme de Arana for the promotion of bilateral cooperation between China and Spain in the renewable energy and environment sectors. It aims to build a bridge between the two countries to promote commercial and technological exchange.

== Overview ==
The Sino-Spanish Association for Energy and Sustainability works in China in contact with stakeholders from the private sector, academia, NGOs, and government to promote sustainable development through international cooperation, exchange of information and knowledge sharing between Europe and China, as well as identify business opportunities. ASEES acts as a ‘Think tank’, analyzing the evolution of the sector, looking for opportunities and preparing market intelligence reports.

ASEES opens a direct channel between Spain and China to share knowledge and technology in sectors where Spain has a competitive leadership. This collaborative platform offers China the tools it needs to undertake reforms in its development model and achieve a more sustainable future.

== ASEES Report ==
ASEES Report. Business Opportunities in China: Renewable Energy and Environment is an extensive research which analyzes in detail the areas of renewable energy, energy efficiency, environment and green transport and construction in China.

Published by ASEES in 2012, it is the first report about green energy and sustainability in China written in Spanish. It is a guide for those green companies that are looking to China as a great business opportunity.

DETAILS Format: PDF Secure Language: Spanish Pages: 352 Figures: 114 Tables: 68
